Nocardioides aquiterrae is a bacterium from the genus Nocardioides that has been isolated from groundwater in South Korea.

References

External links
Type strain of Nocardioides aquiterrae at BacDive -  the Bacterial Diversity Metadatabase

aquiterrae
Bacteria described in 2004